The Dream is the second and final album by American country music duo John & Audrey Wiggins. It was released in 1997 via Mercury Records. The album includes the single "Somewhere in Love", which peaked at number 49 on Hot Country Songs.

Critical reception
Country Standard Time reviewer John Johnson gave this album a mixed review, saying that it had mostly generic songwriting and production, but citing "I Can Sleep When I'm Dead" as a standout track. Allmusic critic Stephen Thomas Erlewine gave it three stars out of five, calling it a "little slicker" than the duo's first album, and that it was "enjoyable" but did not offer substantial songs. Geoffrey Himes of New Country gave it three stars out of five, calling the album's cover version of Poco's 1978 hit "Crazy Love" the best track on the album, and saying that the other strong songs were the ones that included shared lead vocals. The album's title track includes a 1962 recording of their father, Johnny Wiggins, singing "Honeymoon with the Blues".  "Once You've Loved Somebody" was covered by the Dixie Chicks on their 1998 album, Wide Open Spaces.

Track listing
"Somewhere in Love" (Kerry Kurt Phillips, Chuck Leonard) – 3:17
"Once You've Loved Somebody" (Thom McHugh, Bruce Miller) – 3:33
"I Can Sleep When I'm Dead" (Leslie Satcher, Max T. Barnes) – 3:47
"Little Bitty Pieces" (John Wiggins) – 3:35
"Crazy Love" (Rusty Young) – 3:09
"Were You Ever Really Mine" (Tim Mensy, Gary Harrison) – 3:01
"Be Still My Heart" (Gordon Kennedy, Randy Thomas) – 4:07
"Party Down" (Michael Garvin, Anthony L. Smith, P.R. Battle) – 3:30
"Going with My Heart" (Wiggins) – 3:43
"If a Train Left for Memphis" (George Teren, Don Pfrimmer, Tim Buppert) – 2:49
"The Dream" (Harley Allen, Clive Williams) – 5:34
features Johnny Wiggins performing "Honeymoon with the Blues" in 1962 with spoken intro by Ernest Tubb

Personnel
Bruce Bouton – steel guitar
Mike Brignardello – bass guitar
Joe Chemay – bass guitar, background vocals
Stuart Duncan – fiddle
Larry Franklin – fiddle
Paul Franklin – steel guitar
John Hobbs – piano, keyboards
Dann Huff – acoustic guitar, electric guitar, 12-string guitar, gut string guitar, bouzouki
Kim Keyes – background vocals
Paul Leim – drums, percussion
Terry McMillan –percussion
Steve Nathan – keyboards
Michael Omartian – piano, accordion
Don Potter – acoustic guitar
Matt Rollings – piano
Joe Spivey – fiddle, mandolin
Billy Joe Walker, Jr. – acoustic guitar
Biff Watson – acoustic guitar
Lonnie Wilson – drums
Curtis Wright – background vocals

References

1997 albums
John & Audrey Wiggins albums
Mercury Nashville albums
Albums produced by Dann Huff